Alfred Carmine "Fred" Cerullo III (born December 16, 1961) is an actor and former Republican Party official from Staten Island, New York City, who has held many local leadership positions.

Biography
Alfred III was born on December 16, 1961 in Brooklyn to Alfred C. Cerullo Jr and the former Elizabeth Russo. He was raised in the Great Kills neighborhood of Staten Island in New York City, and is the nephew of Oscar-nominated actress Patty McCormack.

He received a Bachelor's Degree in English and American Studies from St. John's University and his law degree from St. John's University School of Law. In 1990 he was elected to the New York City Council as the only seated Republican, which made him the minority leader. He left that position to become Commissioner of the New York City Department of Consumer Affairs in 1994, and in 1995 was appointed Commissioner of the New York City Department of Finance. He left office in 1999. He has been president of the Grand Central Partnership since 1999, and for many years has acted in theater and television.

References

External links
 

New York City Department of Consumer and Worker Protection
New York City Department of Finance
St. John's University (New York City) alumni
St. John's University School of Law alumni
Commissioners in New York City
New York City Council members
New York (state) lawyers
New York (state) Republicans
Living people
1961 births
20th-century American male actors
21st-century American male actors
American male stage actors
American male television actors
Male actors from New York City
American nonprofit executives
People from Brooklyn
People from Great Kills, Staten Island